The Women's 67.5 kg powerlifting event at the 2004 Summer Paralympics was competed  on 24 September. It was won by Heba Ahmed, representing .

Final round

24 Sept. 2004, 17:15

References

W
Para